The Sporormiaceae are a family of fungi in the order Pleosporales. Taxa have a cosmopolitan distribution and are saprobic on dung (coprophilous) and rotting vegetation.

Description
The Sporormiaceae are characterized by having dark brown, septate spores with germ slits.

Genera
As accepted by GBIF;
 Anekabeeja 
 Chaetopreussia  (2)
 Forliomyces  (2)
 Niesslella
 Pleophragmia  (4)
 Preussia  (138)
 Preussiella  
 Sparticola  (7)
 Sporormia  (37)
 Sporormiella  (79)
 Spororminula 
 Sporormurispora  (5)
 Westerdykella  (34)

Figures in brackets are approx. how many species per genus.

References

Dothideomycetes genera
Pleosporales
Taxa named by Anders Munk
Taxa described in 1957